Ángel Gallardo (born 29 July 1943) is a Spanish professional golfer.

Gallardo was a member of the European Tour from its first official season in 1972 until 1982. He finished in the top one hundred of the European Tour Order of Merit in each of those eleven seasons, with a best ranking of tenth in 1977. His only official European Tour win was the 1977 Italian Open however he did win the 1967 Portuguese Open and the 1970 Spanish Open, events that would soon be enfolded into the European Tour schedule. He also won the 1971 Mexican Open.

He was  the second non-British golfer to be elected as Captain of the PGA of Great Britain and Ireland in 1982.

Since leaving the tour, Gallardo has worked as a coach and as a golf course architect, with work that has included co-designing the PGA Golf de Catalunya, venue for the Open de España in 2009. He was vice-chairman of the PGA European Tour from  1995 to 2019 and is now Ambassador of the PGA European Tour.

Professional wins (7)

European Tour wins (1)

European Tour playoff record (1–1)

Other wins (6)
1967 Portuguese Open
1969 Sumrie Better-Ball (with Maurice Bembridge)
1970 Spanish Open
1971 Mexican Open
1973 Memorial Olivier Barras, Copa Raleigh

Results in major championships

Note: Gallardo only played in The Open Championship.

CUT = missed the half-way cut (3rd round cut in 1980 Open Championship)
"T" = tied

Team appearances
World Cup (representing Spain): 1969, 1970, 1971, 1972, 1973, 1975
Double Diamond International (representing Continental Europe): 1972, 1974, 1977 (captain)
Marlboro Nations' Cup (representing Spain): 1972 (winners), 1973
Sotogrande Match/Hennessy Cognac Cup (representing the Continent of Europe): 1974, 1976 (captain), 1978 (captain), 1980 (captain)

External links

Spanish male golfers
Golfers from Catalonia
European Tour golfers
Sportspeople from Barcelona
1943 births
Living people
20th-century Spanish people
21st-century Spanish people